Christopher Mamengi (born 3 April 2001) is a Dutch football player who plays as a left back for FC Utrecht.

Honours

Netherlands U17
 UEFA European Under-17 Championship: 2018

References

External links
 

2001 births
Living people
Dutch footballers
Netherlands youth international footballers
Dutch people of Angolan descent
Association football defenders
Eerste Divisie players
FC Utrecht players
Jong FC Utrecht players
Sportspeople from Amersfoort
Footballers from Utrecht (province)